Stanislav Vladimirovich Bondarev (born 28 June 1968) is a former Russian professional footballer.

Club career
He made his professional debut in the Soviet Top League in 1985 for FC SKA Rostov-on-Don. In his 7 seasons with SKA he suffered 3 relegations and, as a result, played on every professional level of the Soviet football pyramid, his last season with the club was in the fourth-tier Soviet Second League B.

In 1991 with FC Shakhtar Donetsk, he did not appear in the Soviet Top League, but made two appearances in the Soviet Cup.

References

1968 births
Sportspeople from Tashkent
Living people
Soviet footballers
Russian footballers
Association football defenders
FC SKA Rostov-on-Don players
FC Shakhtar Donetsk players
FC Zhemchuzhina Sochi players
Beitar Tel Aviv F.C. players
Soviet Top League players
Russian Premier League players
Liga Leumit players
Russian expatriate footballers
Expatriate footballers in Israel